Riza Eibenschütz, married name Riza Malata, (17 February 1870 – 16 January 1947), was an Austrian operatic soprano and contralto.

Life 
Born in Budapest, Eibenschütz was the daughter of a merchant. She studied singing at the Konservatorium Wien Privatuniversität with Josef Gänsbacher and Marianne Brandt. Her large vocal range allowed her to sing both soprano and alto parts during her subsequent career as an opera singer.

Eibenschütz received her first engagement at the Opernhaus Leipzig, where she made her debut as Selica (L'Africaine) in 1894. After that she sang for two years at the Stadttheater Strasbourg. In 1897 she went on a two-year North American tour with the Damrosch Opera Company. Afterwards she returned to the Leipzig Opera, to whose ensemble she belonged from 1899 to 1902. On 15 February 1902 she appeared at the premiere of the opera  by Felix Weingartner. In 1901 she had a guest appearance in Munich.

In 1902 Eibenschütz became a member of the Semperoper in Dresden. She had several guest appearances, among others at the court opera of Berlin (1892 and 1908).

Among Eibenschütz' most successful roles were Brünnhilde (Der Ring des Nibelungen), Senta (Der Fliegende Holländer), Rezia (Oberon), Rachel in Halévy's (La Juive) and Leonore in Fidelio. There are several recordings of her, among others published by HMV (Dresden 1908) and Odeon.

After her departure from the stage Eibenschütz worked as a singing teacher in Vienna. Among her pupils was the soprano Hanny Steffek (1927–2010).

Eibenschütz was married to the conductor Oskar Malata (1875-1959). She died in Perchtoldsdorf near Vienna at age 76.

Her siblings were the conductor Siegmund Eibenschütz, the pianist Ilona Eibenschütz and the actress Gina Eibenschüt, her niece the singing teacher Maria Theodora Eibenschütz.

Further reading 
 Ludwig Eisenberg: Großes biographisches Lexikon der Deutschen Bühne im XIX. Jahrhundert. Paul List publishing house, Leipzig 1903, p. 223 f.,.
 Elisabeth Th. Hilscher-Fritz, Monika Kornberger: Eibenschuetz, Familie. In Oesterreichisches Musiklexikon. Online-edition, Vienna 2002 ff., ; printed version: volume 1, published by the Austrian Academy of Sciences, Vienna 2002, .
 Karl-Josef Kutsch, Leo Riemens: Ehnn, Bertha. In Großes Sängerlexikon volume 2, K.G. Saur, Munich 2003, .

Notes

References

External links 
 Eibenschütz, Riza on BMLO
 
 

Operatic contraltos
Austrian operatic sopranos
19th-century Austrian women opera singers
1870 births
1947 deaths
Musicians from Budapest
20th-century Austrian women opera singers